The County Road 557–West Branch Escanaba River Bridge is a bridge located on County Road 557 as it passes over the West Branch of the Escanaba River in Wells Township in Marquette County, Michigan. It was listed on the National Register of Historic Places in 1999.

History
In 1928, the Michigan State Highway Department determined a bridge was necessary in this location. In March, the department awarded a construction contract to the P.J. Nickel Company of Ironwood, Michigan, valued at $20,016.19. Nickel used a steel superstructure fabricated by the Massillon Bridge and Structural Company of Massillon, Ohio, to finish the bridge.

The bridge construction is significant because it was one of the first truly long single-span bridges constructed in the state. Recent (at the time) improvements in I-beam fabrication allowed the construction of steel stringer bridges of extended length. Since construction, the bridge has been essentially unaltered.

Description
The structure is a steel stringer bridge, constructed of rolled I-beams supported simply by straight-walled concrete abutments on each side of the river. The outside of the stringers are encased in concrete, giving the bridge the appearance af an all-concrete construction. The deck is concrete, resurfaced with asphalt. Guardrails with fluted balusters and paneled bulkheads run along each side of the bridge.

See also
 
 
 
 
 National Register of Historic Places listings in Marquette County, Michigan

References

National Register of Historic Places in Marquette County, Michigan
Bridges completed in 1928
Road bridges on the National Register of Historic Places in Michigan
1928 establishments in Michigan
Steel bridges in the United States
Buildings and structures in Marquette County, Michigan